Acantholycosa levinae is a species of wolf spider only known to inhabit the Katunski Mountain Range in the Russian part of the Altai Mountains.

This dark-coloured, long-legged spider is about 7.5 mm in length. The abdomen has lighter markings: a heart-shaped mark and two rows of spots.

References

Lycosidae
Spiders described in 2003
Spiders of Russia